Christine Bakundufite (born September 29, 1970) is a Rwandan politician and economist. She currently serves as a member of the Parliament of Rwanda's Chamber of Deputies for Gatsibo District in Eastern Province.

Bakundufite was elected to parliament in 2018. She previously worked as a headmistress, accountant, and accountant specialist.

References 

Living people
Members of the Chamber of Deputies (Rwanda)
1970 births